The 1996–97 Hartford Whalers season was the 25th season of the franchise and the 18th and final season in Hartford. The Whalers would move to Greensboro, North Carolina, the next season to become the Carolina Hurricanes.

Off-season
On June 22, the Whalers participated in the 1996 NHL Entry Draft held at the Kiel Center in St. Louis, Missouri. Hartford did not have a selection in the first round, as the pick was traded to the Boston Bruins as part of the trade that brought Glen Wesley to the Whalers. In the second round, Hartford made their first selection of the draft, as they drafted Trevor Wasyluk from the Medicine Hat Tigers of the Western Hockey League with the 34th overall pick in the draft. Wasyluk scored 25 goals and 46 points in 69 games during the 1995-96 season. Other notable selections by the Whalers included Craig MacDonald in the fourth round, and Craig Adams in the ninth round.

The Whalers acquired Kevin Brown in a trade with the Anaheim Mighty Ducks in exchange for Espen Knutsen on October 1. Brown played in seven games with the Los Angeles Kings during the 1995-96 season, scoring one goal. Brown spent the majority of the season with the Phoenix Roadrunners of the IHL, scoring 10 goals and 26 points in 45 games. He also played in eight games with the Prince Edward Island Senators of the AHL, scoring three goals and nine points after he was traded from the Kings to the Ottawa Senators during the season.

On October 2, Hartford claimed Kent Manderville off of waivers from the Edmonton Oilers. In 37 games with the Oilers during the 1995-96 where he scored three goals and eight points.

Regular season
On April 13, 1997, the Whalers played their last game in Hartford, defeating the Tampa Bay Lightning 2–1. Fittingly, team captain Kevin Dineen scored the final goal in Whaler history.

The final words from SportsChannel New England with Play by play voice John Forslund at the end of the game were as follows:

"It's over folks, it's been a great ride. The Whalers will go out, winners".

Final standings

Schedule and results

Player statistics

Regular season
Scoring

Goaltending

Note: GP = Games played; G = Goals; A = Assists; Pts = Points; +/- = Plus-minus PIM = Penalty minutes; PPG = Power-play goals; SHG = Short-handed goals; GWG = Game-winning goals;
      MIN = Minutes played; W = Wins; L = Losses; T = Ties; GA = Goals against; GAA = Goals-against average;  SO = Shutouts; SA=Shots against; SV=Shots saved; SV% = Save percentage;

Awards and records

Transactions
The Whalers were involved in the following transactions during the 1996–97 season.

Trades

Waivers

Free agents

Draft picks
Hartford's picks at the 1996 NHL Entry Draft held at the Kiel Center in St. Louis, Missouri.

Departure from Hartford
In 1994, Compuware founder Peter Karmanos purchased the Whalers. Karmanos pledged to keep the Whalers in Hartford for four years. Frustrated with lackluster attendance and corporate support, he announced in 1996 that if the Whalers were unable to sell at least 11,000 season tickets for the 1996–97 season, he would likely move the team. Furthermore, ownership only made season tickets available in full-season (41-game) packages, eliminating the popular five- and ten-game "mini plans," in a strategy largely designed to spur purchases from wealthier corporations and individuals. Sales were underwhelming at the beginning of the campaign, and at the end of the 1995–96 season it was still unknown whether the Whalers would stay in Connecticut or move. However, thanks to an aggressive marketing campaign, and the creative efforts of many fans (who pooled together resources to purchase some of the full-season packages collectively) the Whalers announced that they would stay in Connecticut for the 1996–97 season.

In early 1996, negotiations between the Whalers and Connecticut Governor John G. Rowland to build a new $147.5 million arena seemed to be going well. However, negotiations fell apart when Rowland and the State refused Karmanos' demand to reimburse the Whalers for up to $45 million in losses during the three years the new arena was to be built. As a result, the team announced on March 26, 1997, that they would leave Hartford, one of the few times that a team announced it would leave its current city without having already selected a new city. Many suspected that Governor John G. Rowland did not want to keep the Whalers, as he harbored hopes of instead landing an NFL franchise.  Ideally, Rowland wanted to use the state's resources to build a new stadium to lure the New England Patriots to Connecticut and did not have serious intentions of building an NHL arena for the Whalers.

References
 Whalers on Hockey Database

 

1996-97
1996–97 NHL season by team
1996–97 in American ice hockey by team
Hart
Hart